is a railway station on the Sanin Main Line in the Hōhoku area of Shimonoseki, Yamaguchi, Japan, operated by West Japan Railway Company (JR West).

Station layout
The station consists of an island platform serving two tracks. The platform is accessible via an uncovered footbridge. There is a toilet available near the station building, which is located on the north side of the tracks. Though managed by the Nagato Railroad Bureau, there are no station staff members.

History
7 December 1930 - The opening of the extension of the Mine Line, as it was then, from Nagato-Furuichi Station to Agawa Station. Services for passenger and freight trains commence.
24 February 1933 - Areas of the Mine line including Nagato-Awano Station are incorporated into the San'in Main Line.
1 June 1963 - The service of freight trains is cancelled.
1 April 1987 - Under the privatisation of Japan's railways, Nagato-Awano Station becomes part of the West Japan Railway Company.

Platforms

※The platforms are not numbered at this station.

Lines
The following lines pass through or terminate at Nagato-Awano Station:
West Japan Railway Company
San'in Main Line

Local area
There are several small shops around the station. The station is located in the village of Awano, which is at the north end of Shimonoseki city, and roughly 1 kilometre East from the border of Nagato city.
 Awano Port (Awano Fishing Harbour) - Former ferry port that linked to Kuzu in Yuya (of the former Ōtsu District)across the Yuya Bay.
 Awano Post Office
 Awano River - The aonori collected near the mouth of the river is a local speciality.
 Japan National Route 191

User statistics
Below are the average number of people who alight at Nagato-Awano Station per day.
 1999 - 103
 2000 - 97
 2001 - 70
 2002 - 71
 2003 - 58
 2004 - 53
 2005 - 49
 2006 - 32
 2007 - 29
 2008 - 25
 2009 - 22
 2010 - 27

References

External links
 JR West station information 

Railway stations in Japan opened in 1930
Railway stations in Yamaguchi Prefecture
Sanin Main Line
Stations of West Japan Railway Company